Li Lingyu (born 9 April 1963, in Shanghai) is a Chinese singer and actress.

Biography
Li was born in Shanghai in 1963. She is a student of the notable singer Wang Kun.

In 1980, she was admitted to the Beijing Red Flag Yue Opera Company, performing Yue opera. In 1984, she joined the China Oriental Song and Dance Troupe. There she met her first husband and married at the age of 21.

Her first television role was in the 1986 adaptation of Journey to the West. She released her first album in 1987, Sweet Song Queen.

In 1993, she moved to Japan, partly because of marital difficulties, and worked there for two years as an anchorwoman for MTV Japan.

Li migrated to Canada in 1995, married a Canadian investment manager in 1997, and gave birth to a son in 2000.

In 2005, she was appointed a part-time lecturer at the School of Continuing Education in California. She also returned to singing with a RMB one million deal for her successful album Beauty Chant.

Filmography

Films
 1988: A Mysterious Heroine as Wu Qi / Ning Ning
 1988: A Dream of Red Mansions as Third Sister You
 1989: Sister Outlaw as singer
 1990: The Ninth Unresolved Case as Su Chunni
 2005: Life Adventure (musical 3-D film) as Yu the Sun Goddess
 2010: Chongqing Blues as  Fang Hui
 2012: Harpoon as Laura
 2016: When We Were Young as Fang Ziyun
 2018: Equity Situation as Li Xuehui
 2019: Pegasus as Zhu Chunjuan

Television
 1986: Journey to the West as Yu Tu / Princess Jade Rabbit
 1992: Stories from the Editorial Board as Fei Lili
 1993: Haima Song and Dance Hall as friendship guest appearance
 1994: Temporary Family as friendship guest appearance
 2002: Legendary Li Cui Lian II as Yan Guifei
 2004: Xiaozhuang Mishi as an imperial concubine
 2012: The youth I never indulged as Liang Yiyun
 2013: Military woman as Ming Kexin
 2014: New Moment in Peking as Yao's wife
 2014: The Love Is Inconceivable as cameo
 2015: The Cage of Love as Mrs. Jiang
 2015: Cao Cao as Lady Ding
 2017: Love of Aurora as Lei Cai Ying (Li Ming Zhe's mother)
 2020: Storm in the Black River as Lin Yin 
 2020: Qing Qing Zi Jin as Yu Maid

References

External links
 

1963 births
Living people
Chinese women singers
Actresses from Shanghai
Singers from Shanghai
Chinese stage actresses
Educators from Shanghai
Chinese television actresses
Chinese film actresses
Yue opera actresses